Lindauer DORNIER GmbH is a family-owned business textile machinery manufacturer located in Lindau, Germany. Originally part of the Dornier GmbH it was spun off in 1985.

External links
 Company website

Machine manufacturers
Textile machinery manufacturers
Companies based in Bavaria
Manufacturing companies of Germany